HMS Foresight was one of nine F-class destroyers built for the Royal Navy during the 1930s. She was assigned to the Home Fleet upon completion. Unlike her sister ships, she does not appear to have been attached to the Mediterranean Fleet in 1935–36 during the Abyssinia Crisis, nor did she enforce the arms blockade imposed by Britain and France on both sides of the conflict the Spanish Civil War of 1936–1939. The ship escorted the larger ships of the fleet during the early stages of World War II and played a minor role in the Norwegian Campaign of 1940. Foresight was sent to Gibraltar in mid-1940 and formed part of Force H where she participated in the attack on Mers-el-Kébir and the Battle of Dakar. The ship escorted numerous convoys to Malta in 1941 and Arctic convoys during 1942. Later that year, Foresight participated in Operation Pedestal, another convoy to Malta. She was torpedoed by an Italian aircraft on 12 August and had to be scuttled the next day.

Description
The F-class ships were repeats of the preceding E-class destroyers. They were powered by two Parsons geared steam turbines, each driving one propeller shaft, using steam provided by three Admiralty three-drum boilers. The ships' complement was 145 officers and ratings.

The ships mounted four 4.7-inch (120 mm) Mark IX guns in single mounts, designated 'A', 'B', 'X', and 'Y' in sequence from front to rear. For anti-aircraft (AA) defence, they had two quadruple Mark I mounts for the 0.5 inch Vickers Mark III machine gun. The F class was fitted with two above-water quadruple torpedo tube mounts for  torpedoes. One depth charge rack and two throwers were fitted; 20 depth charges were originally carried, but this increased to 38 shortly after the war began.

Wartime modifications
Between October 1940 and April 1941, Foresight had her rear torpedo tubes replaced by a 12-pounder AA gun. Around this time, she probably had two single  Oerlikon light AA guns installed abreast the bridge. By July 1942, a Type 286 short-range surface search radar was fitted as was a HF/DF radio direction finder mounted on a pole mainmast.

Construction and career
Foresight was ordered on 17 March 1933 from Cammell Laird and was laid down at their Birkenhead shipyard on 31 July, launched on 29 June 1934, and completed on 15 May 1935. The ship cost 245,428 pounds, excluding government-furnished equipment such as the armament. All of the F-class destroyers were assigned to the 6th Destroyer Flotilla (DF) of the Home Fleet, and, Foresight, unlike her sisters, did not leave home waters during the 1930s. The 6th DF was renumbered the 8th Destroyer Flotilla in April 1939, and Foresight remained assigned to it until July 1940. World War II began in September and she was tasked to escort the larger ships of the fleet during this time. She played a minor role in the Norwegian Campaign in early 1940.

In late June, the 8th DF was ordered to Gibraltar where they were to form the escorts for Force H. A few days later, they participated in the attack on Mers-el-Kébir against the Vichy French ships stationed there. On 13 September, Force H rendezvoused with a convoy that was carrying troops intended to capture Dakar from the Vichy French. She returned home for a refit after the battle and was damaged by a near-miss during a German air raid on Liverpool on the night of 21/22 December.

On 31 January 1941, Force H, including Foresight, departed Gibraltar to carry out Operation Picket, an unsuccessful night torpedo attack by eight of Ark Royals Fairey Swordfish on the Tirso Dam in Sardinia. The British ships returned to Gibraltar on 4 February and began preparing for Operation Grog, a naval bombardment of Genoa, that was successfully carried out five days later. Two months later, Foresight escorted the aircraft carrier  as she flew off aircraft for the beleaguered island of Malta near Sicily on 3 April and again on the 27th. This was part of Operation Tiger which included a supply convoy taking tanks to Egypt and the transfer of warships to and from the Mediterranean Fleet. Foresight and her sisters had their Two-Speed Destroyer Sweep (TSDS) minesweeping gear rigged to allow them to serve as fast minesweepers en route to Malta. Despite this, one merchant ship was sunk by mines and another damaged. Foresight escorted another flying-off mission to Malta on 14 June; two days later, after German blockade runners reached France, Force H sortied into the Atlantic on a failed search for more blockade runners. The ship participated in another Malta convoy in late July, during which she had to scuttle her sister Fearless, after she had been crippled by an airborne torpedo on 23 July. Foresight continued to escort the ships of Force H until October, after she participated in another convoy to Malta, Operation Halberd. During this operation, the ship again served as a fast minesweeper, albeit more successfully than the last time she had done so.

The 8th DF returned to Britain after Halberd and resumed their previous task of escorting the ships of Home Fleet for the next six months. In early April 1942, Foresight, Forester and the light cruiser  were part of the close escort for Convoy PQ 14, bound for Murmansk. The trio were then the close escort for Convoy QP 11, returning from Murmansk to Iceland, when Edinburgh was torpedoed on 29 April. The two hits disabled her steering and she had to be towed by the sisters. Two days later, they were attacked by three German destroyers which badly damaged the two destroyers and put another torpedo into Edinburgh, crippling her. Foresight had eight men killed and eleven wounded during the battle. The two destroyers took off the survivors from the cruiser and Foresight scuttled the cruiser with a torpedo. Temporarily repaired at Murmansk, the sisters were part of the light cruiser 's escort home in May. She had to be scuttled on 15 May by the destroyer  after she was set on fire by a German bomber. Foresight spent June under repair.

Foresight was assigned to the convoy escort force for Operation Pedestal, a heavily escorted convoy to Malta in August. On the 12th, she was torpedoed by an Italian Savoia-Marchetti SM.79 bomber at 18:45; the hit broke her back, knocked out her steering, and killed one officer and three ratings. Shortly afterwards, the towing wire fouled Tartars starboard propeller; another wire was rigged by 20:40, but it had to be slipped when an unknown force of one cruiser and two destroyers was spotted at close range. Around 22:30, Foresight was secured alongside Tartar until 05:15 the following day when the cables snapped. Another tow wire was rigged at 06:10, but it was dropped when a submarine periscope was spotted at 09:30 and Tartar dropped depth charges as a precautionary measure even though her ASDIC had not detected any submarines. Around that same time several Axis shadowing aircraft were seen and Tartars commander thought the likelihood of attack was now too high to proceed. He took off the 181 surviving crew and scuttled Foresight with torpedoes at 09:55 at coordinates.

Notes

Bibliography

External links
 IWM Interview with Jocelyn Salter, who commanded HMS Foresight in 1942

 

E and F-class destroyers of the Royal Navy
Ships built on the River Mersey
1934 ships
World War II destroyers of the United Kingdom
Destroyers sunk by aircraft
World War II shipwrecks in the Mediterranean Sea
Maritime incidents in August 1942
Ships sunk by Italian aircraft
Scuttled vessels